Curd snack, cottage cheese bar or curd cheese bar is a type of sweet dairy food made from glazed or unglazed Tvorog with or without filling. Nowadays curd snacks are popular mainly in Eastern Europe and former Eastern Bloc countries: in the Baltic states (Estonia, Latvia and Lithuania) and Eastern Europe (Belarus, Russia (Syrok) and Ukraine ), as well as Hungary (Túró Rudi), Romania, Kazakhstan and Mongolia.

Production 
The main part of a curd snack is made from Tvorog, which is mixed with sugar, sweeteners or other ingredients and milled into a homogenous paste that is pressed into the desired shape and filled with jam or other fillings. The formed bars then pass through the so-called 'glaze waterfall' that coats them in chocolate or another type of glaze. Finally, the curd snacks are cooled in a cooling tunnel and packed.

History 

The mass production of curd snacks began in the 1950s in Soviet Union and they quickly gained popularity. Initially, they were flavoured with simple ingredients, such as vanilla, cocoa and raisins, but since the 1990s the curd snacks have become more varied and also contain ingredients such as cookie bites, apricot, strawberry jam and boiled condensed milk.

In 2012, Kārums curd snack was voted the favorite product by the Latvian consumers, receiving 20% of the votes.

See also
 Twinkie
 Gansito

References

External links

Dairy products
Snack
Belarusian desserts
Estonian desserts
Latvian desserts
Lithuanian desserts
Mongolian cuisine
Romanian desserts
Russian dairy products
Russian desserts
Ukrainian desserts